The Loa Tithing Office is a historic building in Loa, Utah. It was built in 1897 by bricklayer Peter Christensen and carpenter Benjamin E. Brown as a tithing building for members of the Church of Jesus Christ of Latter-day Saints, and it was designed in the Greek Revival style. It was acquired by the Daughters of Utah Pioneers in 1972. The building has been listed on the National Register of Historic Places since March 28, 1985.

References

	
Buildings and structures completed in 1897
Greek Revival architecture in Utah
National Register of Historic Places in Wayne County, Utah
Tithing buildings of the Church of Jesus Christ of Latter-day Saints
1897 establishments in Utah